Shwe Kyar is a 2018 Burmese drama film starring A Linn Yaung, Phway Phway and Thinzar Wint Kyaw. The film produced by Ngwe Thawtar Film Production premiered in Myanmar on March 16, 2018.

Synopsis
Thatoe Theik is a documentary-maker working on a film about the illegal Myanmar prostitution industry. He meets Shwe Kyar, his childhood friend – but each are so changed, at first neither realize this.

Cast
 Phway Phway as Shwe Kyar
 A Linn Yaung as Thatoe Thike
 Thinzar Wint Kyaw as San Htar Nyo

Award

References

External links

2018 films
2010s Burmese-language films
Burmese drama films
Films shot in Myanmar
Films directed by Wyne
2018 drama films